Wila Pukarani (Aymara wila red or blood, pukara pucará (fortress) or mountain of protection, -ni Aymara suffix to indicate ownership, "the one with a red pukara", Hispanicized spellings Vila Pucarani / Villa Pucarani) is a volcano located in the Coipasa salt pan in the Bolivian Altiplano. It is approximately  4,920 m high reaching a prominence of at least 1,200 m. It is situated in the Oruro Department, Sabaya Province, Coipasa Municipality.

The town of Coipasa lies on its northeastern side. An age of 3.7 million years has been inferred from the erosion status of the mountain, which shows evidence of Pleistocene glaciation.

See also
Lauca River

References 

Volcanoes of Oruro Department
Four-thousanders of the Andes